The FAO Major Fishing Areas are areas in the world in what the Food and Agriculture Organization has divided the fishery. This definition is required for the statistical data-gathering, the management of fisheries and jurisdictional purposes. The boundaries of the areas were determined on various considerations with consulting international fishery agencies.

Areas 

The defined areas are:
 Area 18: the Arctic Ocean
 Area 21: the Northwestern part of the Atlantic Ocean
 Area 27: the Northeastern part of the Atlantic Ocean
 Area 31: the Western part of the Atlantic Ocean
 Area 34: the Eastern Central part of the Atlantic Ocean
 Area 37: the Mediterranean Sea and the Black Sea
 Area 41: the Southwestern part of the Atlantic Ocean
 Area 47: the Southeastern part of the Atlantic Ocean
 Area 48: the Antarctic part of the Atlantic Ocean
 Area 51: the Western part of the Indian Ocean
 Area 57: the Eastern part of the Indian Ocean
 Area 58: the Antarctic and Southern parts of the Indian Ocean
 Area 61: the Northwestern part of the Pacific Ocean
 Area 67: the Northeastern part of the Pacific Ocean
 Area 71: the Western Central part of the Pacific Ocean
 Area 77: the Eastern Central part of the Pacific Ocean
 Area 81: the Southwestern part of the Pacific Ocean
 Area 87: the Southeastern part of the Pacific Ocean
 Area 88: the Antarctic part of the Pacific Ocean

References 

Food and Agriculture Organization
Fishing areas
Fisheries law